The 2000 Slough Borough Council election was held on 4 May 2000, at the same time as other local elections across England. Fourteen of the 41 seats on Slough Borough Council were up for election, being the usual third of the council.

Results
The elected councillors were:

Notes:-
 * Member of the Britwellian, Independent, Liberal and Liberal Democrat Group (BILLD) (after the 2000 election)
 (a) Gallick: Formerly served as a Labour councillor 1973–1979 and as a Liberal councillor 1983–1984
 (b) Stokes: Formerly served as a Labour councillor 1983–1986
 (c) Hewitt: Formerly served as a councillor 1975–1979 and 1984–1995
 (d) Cryer: Formerly served as a councillor 1967–1974
 (e) Moore: Formerly served as a councillor 1992–1996
 (f) Long: Formerly served as a councillor 1983–1990
 (g) Haines: Formerly served as a Labour councillor 1987–1991 and 1992–1998

Changes 2000–2001

Note:-
 (a) Howard: Left the Labour Group in 2000 to become a Conservative member

References

Slough
2000 English local elections
2000